The Best Play ESPY Award has been conferred annually since 2002 on the play in a single regular season or playoff game contested professionally under the auspices of one of the four major leagues in the United States and Canada or collegiately under the auspices of the National Collegiate Athletic Association adjudged to be the most outstanding or best.

Between 2002 and 2004, the award voting panel comprised variously fans; sportswriters and broadcasters, sports executives, and retired sportspersons, termed collectively experts; and ESPN personalities, but balloting thereafter has been exclusively by fans over the Internet from amongst choices selected by the ESPN Select Nominating Committee.  The ESPY Awards ceremony is conducted in July and awards conferred reflect performance and achievement over the twelve months previous to presentation. In the last few years, the format has been: sixteen plays are placed in brackets (1 vs. 16, 2 vs. 15, etc.) The winners in voting then advance to the second round. The winners go to the finals, where voters select Best Play. In 2022, there was no elimination format.

List of winners

See also
Best Game ESPY Award

Notes

References

ESPY Awards